John McLoughlin (April 8, 1956 – October 24, 1990), better known by the stage name John Sex, was an American cabaret singer and performance artist in New York City from the late 1970s until his death in late 1990.

Early life
Sex was born on Long Island as John McLaughlin. He attended the School of Visual Arts in New York City, where he knew Keith Haring, Kenny Scharf, and Jean-Michel Basquiat. He often used the print studio there to create punk-style posters for downtown bands, and later for himself. He exhibited some of his word-based art at the "Beyond Words" show at the Mudd Club – alongside artists such as Haring, Kenny Scharf, and Futura 2000 and performers Iggy Pop, Fab Five Freddy and Alan Vega – and at the "New York / New Wave" exhibition at P.S. 1, both in 1981. He soon met Klaus Nomi and Joey Arias in the downtown New York scene and gave up painting, finding he could better express himself in performance.

Early in his career, McLaughlin adopted the stage name "John Sex". He claimed the surname "Sex" was an Americanization of his family's original name, Sexton, but in fact it was created for him by Arias and Nomi "during a period of rampant promiscuity".

Career
After early work as a gay stripper, Sex became an alternative performance artist, creating a character based on an exaggerated, cheesy Las Vegas lounge singer and master of ceremonies. First, along with other SVA graduates and students and Club 57 "Sex developed a persona that simultaneously masked and amplified his polymorphous self, elaborating a mythic yet parodic rock-star figure of mercurial presence". His "Acts of Live Art" series there brought performance art into the club context. He was able to further refine the combination of performance art, drag act, gay go-go dancer, cabaret singer, lounge MC, etc. as a performance art dancer who performed at such legendary New York clubs as Club 57, the Pyramid Club, Danceteria, The Palladium, Paradise Garage and Andy Warhol's Underground. His backup singers, "The Bodacious TaTa's" were often mistaken for drag queens but always consisted of female singers and dancers including Micki French, Wendy Wild, April Palmieri, and Myra Schiller. His costumes were designed by Katy K, who occasionally sat in with the TaTa's.

In 1984, John made a cameo appearance in The Cars' music video Hello Again, directed by Warhol.

For the 1986 gay pride march in New York City, he organized and helped build a float called the Go-Go Stars float which had go-go dancers from various night clubs go-go dancing on it. He performed "Hustle with My Muscle" in the 1988 film Mondo New York. His last public performance was at the Club Mars in New York in 1989. He recorded a four-song E.P. for Sire Records, produced by Mark Kamins and Ivan Ivan, as well as 12" singles and music videos for his songs "Rock Your Body" and "Hustle with My Muscle" and "Bump and Grind It", the latter of which were produced by video artist Tom Rubnitz. "Hustle with My Muscle" and "Bump and Grind It" were released as an A and B side single and this was one of only two releases on Varla Records, a label specializing in alternative New York artists.

Sex's trademark was his long, blond hair which stood straight up, and which he claimed was kept erect by a combination of Dippity-do, Aqua Net, egg whites, beer, and semen. He also dressed in flamboyant costumes. He owned a python named Delilah that was often included in his cabaret act. Sometimes, he would leave the python on stage and come down into the audience and wrestle with patrons of the club.

Death
On October 24, 1990, Sex died from AIDS-related complications at the age of 34. Sex's longtime partner, Wilfredo Vela, succumbed to similar complications four years later.

In popular culture
Sex was one of the downtown personalities profiled in Radicals in Miniature, a play by Ain Gordon with Josh Quillen of So Percussion, performed at the Baryshnikov Arts Center in May 2017.

References
Notes

Further reading
 In Touch magazine #77 March 1983 Portfolio of photographs of John Sex and interview with John Sex (Peter Berlin on front cover)
 Musto, Michael  (1986) Downtown, New York: Vintage Books
 Warhol, Andy; Hackett, Pat (ed.) (1989) The Andy Warhol Diaries, New York: Warner Books

External links
Guide to the April Palmieri collection of John's Sex videos in the Fales Library at NYU
The Joy of John's Sex - video clips of John Sex performances.

1956 births
1990 deaths
20th-century American singers
20th-century American artists
AIDS-related deaths in New York (state)
American electronic musicians
American male erotic dancers
American performance artists
American synth-pop musicians
American gay artists
American gay musicians
Musicians from the New York metropolitan area
Nightclub performers
People from Long Island
Singers from New York (state)
Sire Records artists
School of Visual Arts alumni
20th-century American dancers
20th-century American male singers
20th-century American LGBT people